Gheorghe Harea (born 3 February 1966) is a Moldovan former footballer who played as a midfielder.

International career
Gheorghe Harea played three friendly games at international level for Moldova, scoring one goal in his debut which ended with a 4–2 loss against Georgia.

Honours
Nyva Vinnytsia
Ukrainian First League: 1992–93
Constructorul Chișinău
Moldovan Cup: 2000

References

1966 births
Living people
Moldovan footballers
Moldova international footballers
Association football midfielders
Ukrainian Premier League players
Ukrainian First League players
Moldovan Super Liga players
Liga I players
Liga II players
FC Tighina players
FC Nistru Otaci players
FC Zimbru Chișinău players
FC Tiraspol players
FC Nyva Vinnytsia players
FC Metalist Kharkiv players
FC Rapid București players
FC Politehnica Timișoara players
Moldovan expatriate footballers
Expatriate footballers in Romania
Moldovan expatriate sportspeople in Romania
Expatriate footballers in Ukraine
Moldovan expatriate sportspeople in Ukraine
Expatriate footballers in Indonesia
Moldovan expatriate sportspeople in Indonesia
Footballers from Chișinău